John Mann (26 April 1919 – 24 September 1969) was an Australian cricketer. He played in seven first-class matches for South Australia between 1945 and 1947.

See also
 List of South Australian representative cricketers

References

External links
 

1919 births
1969 deaths
Australian cricketers
South Australia cricketers
Cricketers from Adelaide